TINE SA is the largest Norwegian dairy product cooperative consisting of around 15,000 farmers and 5,600 employees. As of 2013, it has a revenue of 20.4 billion Norwegian kroner (NOK) ($3.41bn, £2.04bn, €2.50bn). The parent company, TINE SA, is a cooperative society owned by its suppliers, the milk producers who deliver milk to the company. The corporation domestically offers the entire spectrum of dairy products, and in many dairy categories, Tine faces little or no domestic competition. This monopolistic position has led to criticism of Tine when shortages occur. Tine's internationally known products are Jarlsberg cheese, Snøfrisk goat cheese, Heidal cheese, Ridder cheese, and Ski-Queen (geitost). Tine is the most dominant of the thirteen agricultural cooperatives in Norway.

History
Dairy cooperatives in Norway go back to 1856, with the first nationwide dairy co-op Den Norske Meieriforening (the Norwegian Dairy Association) being founded in 1881.  The company dates back to 1928, when "Norske Meieriers Eksportlag" (Norwegian Dairies' Export Company) was started. It changed its name to "Norske Meieriers Salgssentral" (Norwegian Dairies' Sales) in 1942, and to "Norske Meierier" (Norwegian Dairies) in 1984. The Tine name has been used as an easily identifiable brand name since 1992 for the company's dairy products.  In 2008, Tine was ranked the world's #1 cooperative by size by the International Cooperative Alliance. In 2010, the company was changed to a nationwide group adapted to the Cooperatives Act, which was introduced from 2008, and the name was changed to TINE SA. TINE SA is one of the 13 farmer-owned nationwide cooperatives that are members of the interest organization Norsk Landbrukssamvirke.

The "tine" is a traditional Norwegian wooden container, not unlike the Shaker-style pantry box, which could be used to keep butter and cheese fresh.

Subsidiaries
Subsidiaries which are partly or fully owned by Tine:

 Diplom-Is, Scandinavia's largest ice-cream producer (100% owned by Tine)
 Fjordland, a ready-made food company (51% owned by Tine)
 Norseland Ltd., Ireland and the United Kingdom division (100% owned by Tine)
 Norseland Inc., distributes and markets Tine's cheeses in Canada and the United States (100% owned by Tine)
 Sunniva, produces and distributes juice and soft drinks in Norway (100% owned by Tine)
 OsteCompagniet, sells and markets expensive cheeses in Norway (100% owned by Tine)
 Wernersson Ost, sells and markets domestic and international cheeses in Sweden and Denmark (100% owned by Tine)

References

External links
Official site

Dairy products companies of Norway
Agricultural cooperatives in Norway
Norwegian companies established in 1928
Food and drink companies established in 1928